Lena Delta Nature Reserve is a Zapovednik (“scientific nature reserve”) located in the delta of the Lena River in Sakha Republic, in the far north of eastern Siberia, Russia. It protects large concentrations of birds, including swans, geese and ducks, loons, shorebirds, raptors and gulls. It is also an important fish spawning site.

The Lena's main outlets are the Trofimov (70%), Bykov and Olenek. Nearby is the settlement of Tiksi, the administrative center of Bulunsky District, on the Bykov channel.

External links

Lena River Delta 2020-21 Slide show from NASA Earth Observatory
USGS Landsat Image
NASA MODIS Image

Lena River
Geography of the Sakha Republic
Protected areas of the Arctic
Nature reserves in Russia
1985 establishments in Russia
Protected areas established in 1985
Zapovednik